SP-101 may refer to:
 SP-101 (Brazil), a State highway in Brazil
 Ruger SP101, a series of double-action revolvers
 USS Panama (SP-101), an armed motorboat that served in the United States Navy as a patrol vessel from 1917 to 1920